Politically Incorrect (commonly abbreviated PI) is a mainly German-language counter-jihad political blog which focuses on topics related to immigration, multiculturalism, and Islam in Germany and Western societies. A condensed version of the weblog is available in English. The blog is one of the oldest German far-right sites, which has been spreading hate speech against Muslims and migrants in Germany. The content is amplifying the fear of Islam. 

PI self-declared goal is to bring news to a wider public attention which it perceives to be ignored or suppressed in what PI declared as "the mainstream media" due to a pervading "leftist political correctness". The site has no imprint or legal details; the editors and authors are disguised.

According to Der Spiegel up from April 2021 the Federal Office for the Protection of the Constitution (Verfassungsschutz) classifies PI as "verified as extremistic" („erwiesen extremistisch“) and is observing the PI-activist. The blog's local news bureau in Bavaria, though, is investigated by the Bavarian Office for the Protection of the Constitution.

History 
Politically Incorrect was founded in 2004, soon after the re-election of George W. Bush, by a German teacher named Stefan Herre "to do something against Anti-Americanism"; its popularity surged in the wake of the Muhammad cartoons controversy the following year. It is one of the most successful German blogs, receiving several tens of thousand visitors each day and ranking among the thousand biggest German websites in terms of traffic. The site ranked ninth in March 2013 among German blogs in terms of public resonance in virtual social networks. The blog is interactive, allowing visitors to leave comments within a certain time limit.

Herre has also been on the board of advisors of the organisation Stop Islamization of Nations (SION), and participated in the 2007 international counter-jihad conference in Brussels.

Reception 
The blog has been widely criticized by German media for inciting Islamophobia and equating Islam as a whole with Islamic extremism. The blog's internet shop sells items with the slogan "Islamophobic and proud of it". Herre says his Islamophobia is without shame: "Phobia is fear, and I'm afraid of Islam."

The SPD politician Sebastian Edathy, a spokesman for the party on interior affairs, views Politically Incorrect as a vehicle of right-wing populist agitation. It is not observed, however, by the German Federal Office for the Protection of the Constitution which sees it as differing from right-wing extremism in its support of a democratic order and basic rights, as well as its pro-Israel stance. Even so, the Munich local group which cooperates with the German Freedom Party is monitored by the Bavarian branch of the office since April 2013.

See also 
 Criticism of Islam
 Criticism of multiculturalism

References

External links 
 Politically Incorrect 

Counter-jihad
German political websites
Blogs critical of Islam
Anti-Islam sentiment in Germany
Anti-immigration politics in Germany
Islamophobic publications
Hate speech
Media of Neue Rechte